In anatomy, cervical is an adjective that has two meanings:
 of or pertaining to any neck.
 of or pertaining to the female cervix: i.e., the neck of the uterus.

Commonly used medical phrases involving the neck are
cervical collar
cervical disc (intervertebral disc)
cervical lymph nodes
cervical nerves
cervical vertebrae
cervical rib
Phrases that involve the uterine cervix include
cervical cancer
cervical smear or Pap smear